ST Action was a video game magazine published in the UK during the late 1980s and early 1990s that covered the Atari ST, platform. Some news coverage was also given to the Atari Lynx and Jaguar in the later stages of its life.

ST Action was launched in April 1988 by Gollner Publishing, becoming the first dedicated games magazine for the 16-bit Atari platform. The original team included Hugh Gollner (Publisher), Nick Clarkson (Editor), Steve Merrett, Jason Spiller and Martin Moth (Writers), Greg Percvial (Design). In 1990, Gollner Publishing merged with Europress Interactive, and ST Action made the transition to Europress, under which it would be published for the remainder of its lifespan. During this time, ST Action also proved a useful training ground for a number of gaming journalists including Doug Johns, Paul McNally, Jason Dutton, Alan Bunker and Steve White.

The magazine used digital technology to capture game screenshots, becoming the first video game magazine in the world to do so. Games magazines traditionally took screenshots using a camera positioned in front of the screen. Ian Tindale found that he could use Mac-based technology to perform the image capture, saving time and cost.

Competitors
For much of its lifespan, it was the only video game magazine dedicated to the Atari ST. Its competitors, including ST Format and Atari ST User, covered a combination of games and technical subjects associated with the machine. This changed in May 1991 with the launch of The One for ST Games by EMAP Publishing. Both magazines co-existing until April 1992, when it was revealed that Europress Interactive had bought The One for ST Games and incorporated it into ST Action. The May 1992 edition (issue 49) promoted the merger, declaring it to be "TWO great mags for the price of one!". However, in reality there was little change to the magazine beyond the addition of The One ST logo and a minor redesign to the news pages.

Decline
The number of game releases for the Atari ST slowed during 1992, resulting in a decrease from 100 pages in the January 1992 edition to 76 pages in the December 1992 issue. The majority of issues published in 1993 contained 68 pages, the majority of which were dedicated to re-released games and regular content (news, letters, tips, help guides, subscription, etc.). The final issue (#67, November 1993) was published in October 1993, after which it was incorporated into Atari ST User.

ST Action served as the games section for Atari ST User for several issues until Atari ST User was closed in November 1994. It was subsequently adopted by Atari ST Review with the December 1994 edition and continued until its closure.

References

External links
Archived ST Action magazines on the Internet Archive

Atari ST magazines
Monthly magazines published in the United Kingdom
Video game magazines published in the United Kingdom
Defunct computer magazines published in the United Kingdom
Magazines established in 1988
Magazines disestablished in 1993
Mass media in West Sussex